The 10th Street galleries was a collective term for the co-operative galleries that operated mainly in the East Village on the east side of Manhattan, in New York City in the 1950s and 1960s. The galleries were artist run and generally operated on very low budgets, often without any staff. Some artists became members of more than one gallery. The 10th Street galleries were an avant-garde alternative to the Madison Avenue and 57th Street galleries that were both conservative and highly selective.

History

The Neighborhood 
In New York City, from the early 1950s through the mid-1960s (and beyond), many galleries began as an outgrowth of an artistic community that had sprung up in a particular area of downtown Manhattan. The streets between 8th Street and 14th Street between Fifth and Third Avenues attracted many serious painters and sculptors where studio and living space could be found at a relatively inexpensive cost. Author Morgan Falconer describes it this way for the Royal Academy of Art Blog:[A]rtists lived and worked around them" ... and although "[t]he backdrop was dull – pool rooms, an employment agency, a metal-stamping factory – but the mood lively and do-it-yourself.... One visitor to a group show in 1951 remembered sheltering from the summer heat under a sign painted by Kline.... By day the artists would work, by night they would frequent "The Club", their private talking-shop, or dance in someone's studio – the tango, the jitterbug, even the kazatsky, the Russian folk dance beloved by Communists and Russophiles in the 1930s. Finding the audience for vanguard contemporary art to be small and the venues in which to show few, artists began to band together to launch and maintain galleries as a solution to the lack of other showing opportunities. Thus began a neighborhood in which several (some now legendary) co-operative galleries were formed, and a few non co-operative galleries as well.

Many of the artists who showed in these galleries, which are often referred to as the 10th Street Co-ops or the 10th Street Scene, have since become well known. Other artists who showed in these galleries are still under known, but in many cases have continued to work with zeal and dedication whether or not they are now famous. Some of the most well-known galleries that made the area what it was were: the Tanager Gallery, The March Gallery, The Hansa Gallery, The Brata Gallery, The James Gallery, The Phoenix Gallery, The Camino Gallery, and the Area Gallery. Although the 10th Street galleries have almost all closed, the Phoenix Gallery remains albeit in a new location and with a new membership.

The Artists 
"Approximately 250 artists were dues-paying members of these co-operative galleries between 1952 and 1962. More than 500 artists and possibly close to 1000 artists exhibited on Tenth Street during those years." Several older and more established artists such as Willem de Kooning, Franz Kline and Milton Resnick maintained studios nearby, and often served a supporting role for the many younger artists who gravitated to this scene.

During the most active years of the 10th Street cooperatives, sculptors William King, David Slivka, James Rosati, George Spaventa, Sidney Geist, Israel Levitan, Gabriel Kohn, and Raymond Rocklin, became known as representatives of the 10th Street style of sculpture, even though there was remarkable diversity in their work.

Other galleries associated with the area and the time were the Fleischman Gallery, the Nonagon Gallery, the Reuben Gallery, the Terrain Gallery and the gallery at the Judson Church, which were not co-operatives.

The galleries on and nearby 10th Street played a significant part in the growth of American art and in the diversification of styles that are evident in the art world of today. The 10th Street scene was also a social scene, and openings often happened simultaneously on common opening days. This afforded a way for many artists to mingle with each other and the writers, poets, curators and occasional collectors who gravitated to the scene. The artists and galleries that made up the 10th Street scene were a direct predecessor to the SoHo gallery scene and the more recent Chelsea galleries.

By Photo 
(Selection was limited by availability.)

By Representative work 
(Selection was limited by availability.)

Tanager Gallery, 1952–1962

Locations
Fall 1953 – summer 1962 at 90 East 10th Street
Summer 1952 – fall 1953 at 51 East 4th Street

Members

Hansa Gallery, 1952–1959

Locations
Fall 1952 − fall 1954 at 70 East 12th Street
Fall 1954 − summer 1959 at 210 Central Park South

Members

Directors
Richard Bellamy and Ivan Karp

James Gallery, 1954–1962

Locations
Fall 1954 – summer 1962 at 70 East 12th Street

Members

Camino Gallery, 1956–1963

Locations
Fall 1956 – Fall 1960 at 92 East 10th Street
Fall 1960 – Fall 1963 at 89 East 10th Street

Members

The Camino closed in November 1963. At that time, six members (Alice Forman, Philip Held, Aaron Levy, Gertrude Shibley, Alida Walsh, Florence Weinstein) joined the Phoenix Gallery, which had moved uptown to 939 Madison Avenue.

Directors

March Gallery, 1957–1962

Locations
March 1957 – January 1962 at 95 East 10th Street

Members

Brata Gallery, 1957 – mid-1960s

Locations
1957 – mid-1960s at 89 East 10th Street

Members

Phoenix Gallery, 1958–present

Locations
October 2014−present at 548 West 28th Street
2003−fall 2014 at 210 Eleventh Avenue
1977−2003 at 560 Broadway
June 1977 at 30 West 57th Street
January 1963−May 1977 at 939 Madison Avenue
October 1958−December 1962 at 40 Third Avenue

Members

Area Gallery, 1958–1965

Locations
Fall 1958 – Summer 1962 at 80 East 10th Street
Fall 1962 – Summer 1965 at 90 East 10th Street

Members

See also
Artist cooperative
Artist-run initiative
Artist-run space
Abstract expressionism
Park Place Gallery

References

Notes

Bibliography

External links
Collection "Joellen Bard's, Ruth Fortel's, and Helen Thomas' exhibition records of 'Tenth Street Days: the Co-ops of the 50s', 1953–1977", Smithsonian
Transcripts: "Oral history interview with Nicholas Krushenick, 1968 Mar. 7–14", Smithsonian

American artist groups and collectives
Artist cooperatives in the United States
1963 establishments in New York City
Contemporary art galleries in the United States
Cultural history of New York City
Defunct art museums and galleries in Manhattan
Art galleries established in 1963